HMS Pelican (L86) was an  sloop, built for the British Royal Navy. She was active during the Second World War and was a successful anti-submarine warfare vessel, being credited with the destruction of four U-boats.

Construction 
Pelican was ordered on 19 March 1937 under the 1937 Building programme from JI Thornycroft at Woolston, Hampshire. She was laid down on 7 September 1937, launched on 12 September 1938, and completed on 2 March 1939. Designed as a general-purpose vessel, and intended for use as a survey ship in the West Indies, Pelican was modified during her build for service as a convoy escort and anti-submarine warfare ship.

Service history

After commissioning and working up Pelican was assigned to Fishery Protection, and at the outbreak of the Second World War  joined convoy defence duties in the North Sea.
In April 1940 Pelican took part in the Norwegian Campaign and was badly damaged in an air raid off Narvik.

After repairs Pelican returned to local escort work but spent much of 1941 under repair following enemy action and accidental damage.

In January 1942 Pelican was assigned to 45 Escort Group escorting OS/SL convoys to and from West Africa. In July 1942 she took part in the destruction of  while escorting convoy OS 33. In October she was part of the escort force for Operation Torch.

After repairs and a refit Pelican was appointed senior officers ship to 1st Support Group, tasked with reinforcing convoys under attack. In May 1943 the group joined the battle around convoy ONS 5, sinking . In June  with ONS 10, Pelican sank .
In the autumn of 1943 1SG worked on the Gibraltar route, but saw little action.

In June 1944 Pelican was part of Operation Neptune, escorting troops and supplies to and from Normandy until withdrawn for refit prior to joining the British Pacific Fleet.

On passage to the Far East Pelican was accidentally damaged at Aden and spent the next year at various dockyards under repair.

Post war service
With the end of hostilities Pelican remained in service, operating with the Mediterranean Fleet. She received the new pennant number 'F86' and was based in Malta, as part of the 2nd Frigate Flotilla. This Flotilla took part in patrols preventing illegal immigrants prior to the foundation of the state of Israel. In 1951 she was paid off and laid up in Reserve.

Re-commissioned in 1954 she served in the South Atlantic before finally decommissioning in 1956. Pelican was scrapped in 1958.

Battle Honours
During her service Pelican was awarded five battle honours.
Norway 1940
Atlantic 1942-44
North Africa 1942 
Normandy 1944 
English Channel 1944

Successes
During her service Pelican was credited with the destruction of four U-boats:

Notes

References
 Clay Blair, Hitler’s U-Boat War Vol I  (1996). 
 Clay Blair : Hitler's U-Boat War Vol II (1998) 
 

 Paul Kemp  : U-Boats Destroyed  (1997) . 
 
 Leo Marriott (1983). Royal Navy Frigates 1945-1983. Ian Allan Ltd. 
 Axel Neistle  : German U-Boat Losses during World War II  (1998). 
 
 Warlow, B : Battle Honours of the Royal Navy (2004)

External links
  HMS Pelican at uboat.net
 HMS Pelican at britainsnavy.co.uk

 

Egret-class sloops
1938 ships
Naval ships of Operation Neptune
Ships built by John I. Thornycroft & Company
World War II sloops of the United Kingdom